KHOU (channel 11) is a television station in Houston, Texas, United States, affiliated with CBS. It is owned by Tegna Inc. alongside Conroe-licensed Quest station KTBU (channel 55). Both stations share studios on Westheimer Road near Uptown Houston, while KHOU's transmitter is located near Missouri City, in unincorporated northeastern Fort Bend County.

History
The station first signed on the air on March 23, 1953, as KGUL-TV (either Gulf of Mexico or seagull). It was founded by Paul Taft of the Taft Broadcasting Co. (no relation to Cincinnati-based company of the same name nor its associated Taft family). Originally licensed to Galveston, it was the second television station to debut in the Houston market (after KPRC-TV, channel 2), taking the secondary CBS affiliation from KPRC-TV as the network's new primary affiliate, and has stayed aligned with the network ever since. One of the original investors in the station was actor James Stewart, along with a small group of other Galveston investors. The studio was located at 2002 45th Street in Galveston.

In 1956, the original owners sold the station to the Indianapolis-based Whitney Corporation (later Corinthian Broadcasting), which became a subsidiary of Dun & Bradstreet in 1971. In June 1959, the station changed its callsign to KHOU-TV (the "-TV" suffix was dropped from the call letters the week following the June 12, 2009 digital transition, as most Belo stations did at the time) and had its city of license relocated to Houston. The Federal Communications Commission (FCC) license listed both the Houston and Galveston service areas for a time. On April 24, 1960, the station moved to its first Houston facilities at 1945 Allen Parkway, along Buffalo Bayou in the Neartown neighborhood west of downtown Houston.

Belo ownership 
In 1984, Dun & Bradstreet sold its entire broadcasting division, including KHOU, to the Belo Corporation, who spun off its Beaumont station, KFDM-TV (channel 6) in order to comply with FCC regulations at the time that prevented one company from owning overlapping signals; both stations had overlapping Grade B signals in the vicinity of Liberty County (east of Houston).

Known for its ownership of The Dallas Morning News and its flagship TV station in its home city of Dallas, WFAA (historically one of ABC's strongest affiliates and a local news powerhouse in that city), Belo began to make significant investments into KHOU, which had become one of CBS' weakest affiliates during the 1980s under the final years of Dun & Bradstreet ownership. With the addition of stronger syndicated programming including the popular game shows Wheel of Fortune and Jeopardy! (both of which were picked up from KPRC-TV) and The Oprah Winfrey Show (which KTRK-TV turned down), the revamping of its news department, and the carrying over of both its Dallas flagship's theme music and popular image branding, The Spirit of Texas, KHOU began to challenge KTRK and KPRC in the local ratings, and eventually became one of CBS' strongest affiliates by the 1990s during a very challenging period for the network. In 1998, KHOU became the first television station in the market to begin broadcasting a high definition digital signal.

On June 13, 2013, the Gannett Company announced that it would acquire Belo for $1.5 billion and the assumption of debt, marking the company's entry into the Texas market and ending KHOU's nearly three decades of ownership by Belo The sale was completed on December 23. Two years later, on June 29, 2015, the Gannett Company split in two, with one side specializing in print media and the other side specializing in broadcast and digital media. KHOU was retained by the latter company, which would be named Tegna.

Hurricane Harvey 
Being situated near Buffalo Bayou in an area that had become prone to flooding, KHOU's longtime studios had become vulnerable to damage from major hurricanes and severe weather as the Houston area grew exponentially over the last six decades. On the night of June 8, 2001, the station's studios flooded during Tropical Storm Allison, resulting in damage to much of the station's offices including its newsroom. The damage was so severe that the station had to cease its ongoing coverage of the ensuing flash flood emergency (which itself had interrupted regular programming that night) and instead broadcast a West Coast feed of the Late Show with David Letterman, followed by a feed from the station's doppler radar for roughly 90 minutes until the station could resume its breaking news coverage which lasted the entire weekend. During Hurricane Ike, which hit the Texas Gulf Coast in mid-September 2008, KHOU's storm coverage was distributed nationwide via DirecTV and XM Satellite Radio, as well as through a live feed on the station's website.

On August 21, 2017, KHOU began covering Hurricane Harvey as the storm was projected to hit the Texas Gulf Coast with extensive rainfall expected in the Greater Houston area. The station began wall-to-wall coverage on August 25, 2017 with extensive coverage of the storm's landfall in Rockport (near Corpus Christi). While initial coverage focused on storm damage and cleanup in parts of KHOU's viewing area, by the following Saturday, August 26, massive and continuous rain bands from the Gulf of Mexico led to catastrophic flooding throughout the metropolitan area, with much of the flooding being unprecedented in many places.

On the early morning of Sunday, August 27, KHOU was forced to evacuate its studios due to rising floodwaters from the nearby Buffalo Bayou. Around 6 a.m., the first floor of the building became inundated with floodwaters, forcing station employees to completely abandon its facility nearly three hours later after a move to a second floor conference room proved to only be a short-term option, though critical equipment (such as the studio's robotic cameras) was also moved up to the second floor before the flooding became worse. The station's brand-new news set (which had debuted in November 2016), weather center, newsroom and master control were destroyed by the floodwaters, which rose up to  within the building. Additionally, the station's over the air signal, including its CBS and diginet feeds, were knocked off the air as computers and other equipment became submerged by floodwaters, with staff relegated to providing updates on social media.

After KHOU's signal was knocked off the air, sister station WFAA began providing live news coverage for KHOU by live-streaming on both station's websites and social media profiles until the station was able to resume broadcasting on its own. The station's staff then evacuated to the nearby Federal Reserve Bank of Dallas Houston Branch building on higher ground while a new contingency plan was drafted.

With the assistance of PBS member station KUHT (channel 8) and master control from WFAA, KHOU eventually resumed live broadcasting later that night from temporary facilities at the LeRoy and Lucile Melcher Center for Public Broadcasting on the campus of the University of Houston. At various times, WFAA, along with Tegna NBC affiliate KUSA in Denver, provided assistance with weather graphics and master control. Due to technical difficulties, WFAA originated the August 27 edition of the 10 p.m. news that was simulcast in both cities. Eventually a reliable signal was established an hour later from KUHT's studios at the Melcher Center and storm coverage continued. KHOU is the third commercial station in Houston to utilize a part of the UH campus for its facilities, after ill-fated KNUZ-TV (channel 39) from 1953 to 1954 and KTRK-TV (channel 13) from its 1954 launch until its 1961 move to its current studios in the Upper Kirby district.

On the evening of August 31, the station resumed CBS programming with its prime time lineup. For the first month, the station only broadcast its main HD channel while its two subchannels (at the time Bounce TV and Justice Network) remained shut down. The following week, on September 4, KHOU began to reuse parts of its previous 2011–2016 news set in the temporary studio. On October 4, the subchannels returned as widescreen SD simulcasts of the main channel in preparation for the eventual return of the diginets, which would finally return on October 12. Around the same time, the station's on-air look returned to normal with full news and weather graphics restored and program guide listings on the terrestrial signal. A temporary news set, similar in design to its previous news set destroyed in the Harvey floods with additional brick accents, would eventually be constructed for the station at the Houston Public Media facilities.

Move to Westheimer studios 

On November 16, 2017, KHOU officially announced it would not return to the Allen Parkway facility; the building would eventually be sold to an affiliate of Service Corporation International (whose headquarters are located in an office building adjacent to the former KHOU studios) and was eventually demolished the following May. In December 2017, KHOU announced that it would open a secondary street-side studio at the George R. Brown Convention Center along Avenida Houston. The studio opened in the fall of 2018, and is primarily used for its weekday newscasts. This setup is similar to that of Dallas sister station WFAA's Victory Park studio, which opened a decade earlier in January 2007.

The station occupies three floors of the high-rise in facilities that include two studios, two control rooms, an open collaboration space for all content producing departments, technical operations, sales and executive offices. The station began its operations from its new facility on Sunday, February 17, 2019, during its 10 p.m. newscast.

On January 21, 2020, KHOU would gain a sister station when Tegna acquired KTBU (channel 55) from Spanish Broadcasting System which had been airing its Mega TV service over that station; the sale was completed on March 24 with KTBU moving its operations three days later into KHOU's Westheimer facilities and dropping Mega TV in favor of Tegna's digital multicast network, Quest, which had previously been airing on KHOU's fourth digital subchannel. While KTBU may serve as an alternate CBS affiliate should KHOU need its main signal for long-form breaking news and severe weather coverage, its primary role has been to serve as a UHF rebroadcaster of KHOU's digital signal (which remains on VHF channel 11).

Pending sale to Cox Media Group 
On February 22, 2022, Tegna announced that it would be acquired by Standard General and Apollo Global Management for $5.4 billion. As a part of the deal, KHOU and KTBU, along with their Austin sister station KVUE and Dallas sister stations WFAA and KMPX, would be resold to Cox Media Group.

Programming
Since its inception, KHOU has been a CBS affiliate, and has largely cleared the entire CBS network lineup without interruption. In addition to its newscasts, KHOU also airs Great Day Houston, a local talk show hosted by Deborah Duncan with paid segments from local businesses in Houston, following CBS Mornings. The talk show, which has aired on the station since 2005, is taped at KHOU's studios on Westheimer Road west of the Galleria. Outside of local programming, KHOU's syndicated offerings include Wheel of Fortune and Daily Blast Live, a Tegna-produced program. During the weekend (sports preemptions notwithstanding), KHOU also carries Texas Country Reporter early Saturday evenings and off-network reruns of CBS dramas SEAL Team and Magnum P.I., as well as those of the Canadian drama Murdoch Mysteries, in late night. KHOU also serves as the local television broadcaster of Houston's annual Thanksgiving Day parade, the H-E-B Holiday Parade.

Despite being in a market with an ABC-owned station (KTRK-TV), Jeopardy! aired on KHOU from 1986 to 2015 and Wheel of Fortune has aired on that station since 1986 despite their presence on ABC's other network-owned stations along with another ABC O&O syndication staple, The Oprah Winfrey Show, which KHOU carried for its entire run from 1986 to 2011. Jeopardy! moved to KTRK on September 14, 2015, making it the last ABC-owned station to carry the quiz show. However, KHOU continues to carry Wheel of Fortune at 6:30 p.m., making Houston one of the few markets in the United States where both game shows air on separate stations; in most markets, both game shows are sold as a package, often airing next to one another on the same station in prime time access. Both shows rarely air next to each other in most markets in the Central and Mountain time zones, as most network affiliates often program a 6 p.m. newscast during the traditional access hour (7 p.m. ET/6 p.m. CT) before prime time, with KTRK itself having aired an hourlong 6 p.m. newscast in this hour since September 1982.

Like most CBS affiliates prior to 1993, KHOU often carried syndicated programming (including Entertainment Tonight and reruns of M*A*S*H) in late night following its 10 p.m. newscast, as the network's late night offerings of the era were considered to be less lucrative compared to syndicated offerings. Beginning in 1993, KHOU (like most CBS affiliates) began carrying the Late Show (then hosted by David Letterman) at 11:05 p.m. CT, eventually moving it to immediately following its 10 p.m. newscast (at 10:35 p.m. CT) by 1995. However, the station had always aired The Late Late Show on a 30-minute delay (beginning at 12:07 a.m. CT) since the show first premiered in 1995, fitting a syndicated sitcom, game show or tabloid news program between the two shows. Because the latter program's original host, Tom Snyder, had a simulcast with the CBS Radio Network (which aired locally on KPRC-AM) and took calls from viewers during his stint as host, KHOU asked via disclaimer for Houston area viewers to not call the toll-free call-in number due to the tape-delay. This practice would continue under later hosts Craig Kilborn and Craig Ferguson, as well as the first few months of James Corden's tenure as host.

On September 8, 2015, it began airing The Late Late Show at its network-approved time (11:37 p.m. CT) following Stephen Colbert's debut as host of The Late Show; leaving the station's only CBS preemption being that of the second half-hour of the Sunday morning talk show Face the Nation, which had been tape-delayed to 2:30 a.m. the following Monday morning due to KHOU's longstanding broadcasts of religious programs from Houston-based Lakewood Church and Second Baptist Church, with the former also airing on Sunday night following its 10 p.m. newscast and KHOU 11 Sports Extra (see below). After Lakewood's broadcasts moved to KTRK in 2020 (only to return to KHOU at 11 p.m. only on Sunday nights the following year), Face the Nation began airing its full hour at 9:30 a.m., where the first half-hour had already been airing for years, with the religious broadcast from Second Baptist Church continuing to air at 10:30 a.m.

Sports programming 
In 2002, the Houston Texans joined the NFL as the league's 32nd franchise, as part of the American Football Conference's newly formed South Division. Being part of the AFC, most Texans games—including all road games against NFC opponents—are aired on CBS (which has held the contract to carry AFC games since the 1998 season), and are therefore aired locally on KHOU. The station also served as the over-the-air outlet for all of the Texans' appearances on Thursday Night Football until 2018 (when Fox picked up the full rights to the Thursday night package that lasted until 2021, thus moving those telecasts locally to KRIV), and have aired simulcasts of ESPN's Monday Night Football in the past (due to ABC's live broadcast of Dancing with the Stars on KTRK conflicting with the games). The Texans are one of two teams never to have been blacked out at home, the other being the Baltimore Ravens; this stands in contrast to the city's previous NFL team, the Houston Oilers, who were often blacked out at home in their twilight years in Houston before moving to Nashville in 1997 for reasons related to the team's controversial management under owner Bud Adams. Beginning in 2014, with the institution of 'cross-flex' rules, games in which the Texans play an NFC opponent at home can be moved from Fox O&O KRIV (channel 26) to KHOU, with the same standard also applying for AFC road games at NRG Stadium being moved over to KRIV.

Other notable appearances by Houston sports teams on KHOU have included the Houston Rockets' 1981 and 1986 appearances in the NBA Finals (both losses to the Boston Celtics; all Rockets games broadcast through CBS' NBA broadcast contract were aired on KHOU from 1973 to 1990) and the University of Houston men's basketball team's two NCAA National Championship appearances in 1983 and 1984—all via their national coverage by CBS Sports. KHOU also carried Southwest Conference football and men's basketball games (with an emphasis on games involving the University of Houston and Rice University) on Saturday afternoons before the conference folded in 1996, as well as CBS' broadcasts of the 2011 and the upcoming 2023 NCAA Final Four and Super Bowls VIII (1974) and XXXVIII (2004)—all of which took place in Houston. Presently, KHOU may also carry select games from the National Women's Soccer League's Houston Dash and select SEC football games involving Texas A&M and LSU (which have large fanbases in the Houston area) via their leagues' respective CBS Sports contracts.

News operation

KHOU presently broadcasts 33 hours, 55 minutes of locally produced newscasts each week (with 5 hours, 35 minutes each weekday, three hours on Saturdays, and 2½ hours on Sundays). On weekdays, this includes a 2½-hour morning newscast from 4:30 a.m. to 7 a.m., a full hour at 4 p.m., and half-hours at noon, 5 p.m., 6 p.m. and 10 p.m. Its weekend newscasts include a 1½-hour morning newscast on Saturday morning, hour-long newscasts at 10 p.m. on Saturday and on Sunday morning, and half-hours at 6 p.m. on Saturday and 5:30 p.m. and 10 p.m. on Sunday. The station also airs KHOU 11 Sports Extra, which features extensive Sunday night sports coverage and commentary, following its 10 p.m. newscast on Sunday night.

Throughout its existence, KHOU has been widely regarded as a stepping stone for many well-known television news personalities, as many of its reporters have gone on to work for national networks. KHOU's best known former on-air staffers include former CBS Evening News anchor Dan Rather, NBC News correspondent Dennis Murphy, newswomen Linda Ellerbee and Jessica Savitch, and sports anchors Jim Nantz (now the lead announcer for CBS Sports), Harry Kalas (later a legendary broadcaster for Major League Baseball and NFL Films) and Ron Franklin (later with ESPN). Outside of broadcasting, one of its former sports anchors, Dan Patrick, eventually became Lieutenant Governor of Texas.

KHOU also has gained a reputation for its investigative reporting staff (currently known as KHOU 11 Investigates), whose most notable stories include its 2000 investigation into defective tire designs by Firestone – which led to the mandatory recall of Wilderness AT, Firestone ATX and ATX II tires, as well as numerous lawsuits (the defective tires resulted in a number of deaths, including that of KTRK reporter Stephen Gauvain), a story in the early 2000s that led to the shutdown of the Houston Police Department's crime lab, and allegations of dropout rate fraud in the Houston Independent School District, which resulted in the dismissal of several HISD officials. All of these stories were initially reported by investigative reporter Anna Werner, who eventually went on to become the chief investigative reporter for CBS News.

The station gained notoriety in 1961 when then-anchor Dan Rather showed what was believed to be the first radar image of a hurricane broadcast on television during Hurricane Carla; this report, which was credited for saving thousands of lives that otherwise would have been lost, would later become a catalyst in his eventual hiring by CBS News. In 1970, KHOU had boasted of the top-rated news team in Houston, led by anchorman Ron Stone (who had been discovered by Rather in 1961), weatherman Sid Lasher and sports anchor Ron Franklin.

The station entered a tumultuous period during the early 1970s, when Stone departed for a radio reporter role with NBC News in New York and Lasher died from a fatal heart attack shortly after KHOU's 6 p.m. newscast concluded one night. Stone would eventually return to Houston in 1972 to become the lead anchor at KPRC-TV, and helped that station to overtake KHOU as the leading news station in Houston. Both stations would eventually be overtaken by KTRK-TV, whose Eyewitness News came to dominate the Houston market for the next several decades and which had become one of ABC's strongest affiliates by the end of the decade, eventually becoming one of the network's owned-and-operated stations in 1986. While the station did hire former KPRC-TV lead anchor Steve Smith away from KDKA-TV in Pittsburgh to become its lead anchor in 1975, KHOU continued to trail its rivals as the decade progressed.  Departures during this period included meteorologist Doug Brown (who himself succeeded Lasher), who joined KTRK in 1976 as its morning meteorologist and three personalities, news anchor Bob Nicolas (in 1979), along with Franklin and anchorman Bill Balleza (both in 1980) departing for similar roles at KPRC.  As a result, channel 11 crashed to last place, and would largely remain entrenched in this position throughout the 1980s.

When Belo acquired KHOU in 1984, the station continued to trail behind dominant KTRK and NBC affiliate KPRC, which usually placed a strong second and would further benefit in the decade from NBC's strong prime time programming of the 1980s. Its newscasts fared even worse than CBS' own floundering network programming itself at the time, occasionally even placing behind syndicated reruns on independent stations in the Houston market. Having achieved considerable success with the news department of its flagship station in Dallas, WFAA, since the 1970s, Belo sought to seek similar results for KHOU, and beginning in the late 1980s hired several high-profile people to its news team. The most notable was former National Hurricane Center director Dr. Neil Frank, who was hired as the station's chief meteorologist in July 1987. In another key move, KHOU also hired former KTRK morning anchor Sylvan Rodriguez (then with ABC News' West Coast bureau) to anchor the station's early evening newscasts.

During this time, KHOU also commissioned an image rebrand using the "Spirit of Texas" slogan and (initially) TM Productions' "Spirit" music package that originated at its Dallas sister station WFAA. In January 1989, KHOU revamped the appearance of its newscasts, with an image campaign that included full-page ads in the Houston Chronicle and Post, as well as an on-air promotional campaign that focused more on ordinary citizens throughout Greater Houston than on its news team. With anchors Steve Smith and Marlene McClinton, chief meteorologist Neil Frank and sports director Giff Nielsen as its main news team, along with a new set, graphics and theme music, KHOU began to mount a serious challenge to the other Houston newscasts, leading to a competitive ratings race during the 1990s. Its resurgent newscasts, combined with a strong syndicated programming lineup, helped to sustain the station through what would be a turbulent ratings period for CBS, which lost broadcast rights to NFL games in addition to several of its largest affiliates during this time.

1999 proved to be a breakout year for KHOU, with its newscasts reaching #1 in viewership in several timeslots during the May sweeps period, unseating KTRK during the midday hours, and at 5:00 (it debuted in May 1974) and 6:00 p.m., which also coincided with CBS' resurgence to number one in prime time by that year. The station's ratings boost also included an exclusive interview with Serbian and Yugoslavian President Slobodan Milosevic during the Kosovo War, just a month before his indictment. This news came despite the retirement of longtime anchor Steve Smith in May 1999, the abrupt resignation of fellow anchor Marlene McClinton during one of the station's newscasts in September 1999 and anchor Sylvan Rodriguez's eventually fatal bout with pancreatic cancer in April 2000. Two former local newscasters in New York City, Greg Hurst of ABC flagship WABC-TV and Len Cannon of Fox flagship WNYW (the latter also a former NBC News correspondent and substitute anchor), would respectively join the station in 1999 (when Hurst replaced Smith) and 2006 (when Cannon replaced Jerome Gray who went to rival KPRC-TV), with Cannon himself becoming lead anchor in 2017, succeeding Hurst (now with fellow CBS affiliate WREG-TV in Memphis).

On February 4, 2007, following CBS' coverage of Super Bowl XLI, KHOU began broadcasting its local newscasts in high definition, becoming the first station in the market to do so. On September 7, 2009, KHOU-TV expanded its weekday morning newscast with the addition of the 4:30 a.m. program First Look; despite being the last station in the Houston market to launch a 4:30 a.m. newscast, KHOU was the first station in the market to announce its intentions to do so (three of Houston's major network affiliates – KHOU, KTRK-TV and KPRC-TV – launched 4:30 a.m. newscasts within three weeks of each other in the late summer of 2009 with little fanfare). On August 1, 2011, KHOU debuted a new half-hour newscast at 4:00 p.m. on weekdays to replace The Oprah Winfrey Show; this would expand to a full hour in 2015 after losing the Houston rights to Jeopardy! to KTRK. Recently, the station expanded its weekend 10 p.m. news broadcast to a full hour, including the aforementioned KHOU 11 Sports Extra on Sunday nights.

In 2018, the station rebranded its weekday morning newscasts as HTownRush, with a format emphasizing social media interaction including its own namesake hashtag, a summary of top stories during the first five minutes of each half-hour, and special segments including in-house features exclusive to Tegna stations such as Deal Boss, one-minute business/technology news briefs from Cheddar, and consumer reporter John Matarese's Don't Waste Your Money consumer segments (which usually air on stations owned by the E. W. Scripps Company). In June 2019, KHOU rebranded its 4 p.m. newscast as The 411, emphasizing a conceptual format and on-air graphics style similar to that of its morning newscast.

Unlike most CBS affiliates, the station did not air a newscast until January 5, 2020 when it launched a new Sunday Morning newscast from 7 a.m. to 8 a.m. prior to CBS Sunday Morning, with the hour instead being filled by one of CBS's three hours of E/I programming which KHOU preempted to carry a Saturday morning newscast in between the two hours of CBS This Morning Saturday. Following the launch of the Sunday morning newscast and subsequent changes in federal regulations on children's television programming, KHOU has since aired two of CBS's three hours of E/I programming from 5 a.m. to 7 a.m. on Saturday morning, followed by the full broadcast of CBS Saturday Morning leading into KHOU's Saturday morning newscast from 9 a.m. to 10:30 a.m.

As of 2021, the station's newscasts have traditionally battled with KPRC for second among stations in the Houston area (behind ABC-owned KTRK); however, their viewership usually has been strongest amongst 35- to 55-year-olds and suburban audiences—traditionally considered by advertisers to be the most crucial demographic groups for news ratings. This is noted since, as of 2011, KHOU is the only Houston area station whose traffic reports cover suburban areas, in addition to the Houston freeways, and frequently features outside webcam shots from suburban locations during its weather reports.

Notable former on-air staff

 Steve Edwards – anchor/talk show host (1972–1975; was at KTTV in Los Angeles) until his termination on December 11, 2017
 Linda Ellerbee – reporter (1972–1973; then with NBC News, later host of Nickelodeon's Nick News)
 Dr. Neil Frank – chief meteorologist (1987–2008; now retired; returns periodically for hurricane coverage and other special weather events)
 Ron Franklin – sports director (1971–1980; later play-by-play announcer at ESPN; deceased)
 John Hambrick – ancher/reporter (1960s; deceased)
 Joanne Herring – host of The Joanne King Show (1950's–1974; later moved to KPRC-TV; now retired)
 Dennis Murphy – reporter/assignment editor (1975–1978; now with NBC News)
 Jim Nantz – sports anchor/reporter (early 1980s; now with CBS Sports as the network's top play-by-play announcer for NFL coverage)
 Chau Nguyen – anchor/reporter (2003–2007)
 Giff Nielsen – sports director (1984–2009); former quarterback for the Houston Oilers, now an elder with the Church of Jesus Christ of Latter-day Saints
 Dan Patrick – sports director (1979–1984; later conservative talk show host and owner of KSEV; now Lieutenant Governor of Texas)
 Dan Rather – anchor/reporter (early 1960s; former anchor of CBS Evening News; now at AXS TV)
 Rick Sanchez – reporter (1986–1988; formerly with CNN, was most recently at RT America until its closure in 2022)
 Jessica Savitch – anchor/reporter (1971–1972; later KYW-TV and NBC News, deceased)
 Janet Shamlian – anchor/reporter (1987–1995; now with CBS News)
 Ron Stone – anchor (1961–1972; later KPRC-TV, deceased)

Technical information

Subchannels
The station's digital signal is multiplexed:

On September 26, 2011, KHOU began broadcasting Bounce TV on its second digital subchannel (which originally launched as a quasi-independent station) upon the network's launch. The station had previously signed on to carry the .2 Network on one of its digital subchannels, although .2 Network never debuted. In 2015, the station began carrying programming from the Justice Network on its third digital subchannel. Quest was added to the fourth digital subchannel on January 16, 2018 and was changed to a simulcast of sister station KTBU after that station switched to the network on March 27, 2020; as of April 5, 2021, the fourth digital subchannel is affiliated with Twist. The fifth digital subchannel, Circle, which is 50 percent owned by Gray Television with the other half owned by a subsidiary of Ryman Hospitality Properties' Opry Entertainment Group, debuted with the network on January 1, 2020.  Bounce TV moved to KPXB-DT2 in January 2022.

Analog-to-digital conversion
KHOU discontinued regular programming on its analog signal, over VHF channel 11, on the morning of June 12, 2009, as part of the federally mandated transition from analog to digital television. The station's digital signal relocated from its pre-transition UHF channel 31 to VHF channel 11.

References

External links

 
KHOU Collection at the Texas Archive of the Moving Image

CBS network affiliates
True Crime Network affiliates
Circle (TV network) affiliates
Twist (TV network) affiliates
Tegna Inc.
Television channels and stations established in 1953
HOU
1953 establishments in Texas
Former Gannett subsidiaries